Lars Schwander (born 15 December 1957) is a Danish photographer and gallerist. As a photographer he is most known for his portraits of international artists. In 1996 he founded Fotografisk Center in Copenhagen, an exhibition space for art photography.

Biography
Lars Schwander (www.larsschwander.com) was born in 1957. In the 1980s he was the co-editor of the magazine Sidegaden before founding his own magazine Copyright.

Photography
Schwander has portrayed many international artists in his photography, including Björk, Leonard Cohen, Annie Leibovitz, Peter Greenaway, Roger Ballen, Günther Förg, Martin Kippenberger, Duane Michals, Helmut Newton, Yoko Ono, Cindy Sherman and Lawrence Weiner.

His artistic work is represented in international collections such as those of Bibliothèque Nationale in Paris, the Musée de la photographie in Belgium, the Royal Danish Library in Copenhagen, the Brandts Museum of Photographic Art, Louis Vuitton Foundation in Paris, the Lenono Photo Archive in New York and the extensive German Olbricht Collection in Essen.

Other photography-related activities
In 1996 Schwander established the Fotografisk Center at Gammel Strand in Copenhagen and in 2008 he opened a second photography gallery, annexone.org in Amaliegade. He has also written a number of books and catalogues on photography and photographers, including a biography of Viggo Rivad, as well as a reviewer of photography books and exhibitions for national daily Politiken.

Schwander has also curated exhibitions for the Louisiana Museum of Modern Art. and sits on boards and committees of the Danish art world as well as on the jury in the Fogtdal Photographers Award.

Bibliography

 Viggo Rivad - Mellem lys og skygge (2000). Gyldendal. 
 Portraits of Artists / Portraits d'Artistes / Kunstnerportrætter (2001). Forlaget Rhodos, International Science and Art publishers.

See also
 Photography in Denmark

References

Danish photographers
20th-century Danish photographers
21st-century Danish photographers
1957 births
Living people